Israel competed at the 1992 Summer Olympics in Barcelona, Spain. 30 competitors, 25 men and 5 women, took part in 42 events in 10 sports. Israel won its first ever Olympic medals at these Games. The first medallist in Israel's history was Yael Arad, who won silver on July 30 in judo's under-61 kg category for women, and she was followed a day later by another judoka, Oren Smadja, who won bronze in men's under-71 kg category.

Medalists

Competitors
The following is the list of number of competitors in the Games.

Results by event

Athletics

Fencing

Gymnastics

Judo

Sailing

Shooting

Swimming

Tennis

Weightlifting

Wrestling

References

Nations at the 1992 Summer Olympics
1992
Summer Olympics